The women's 10 metre air rifle event at the 2016 Summer Olympics took place on 6 August 2016 at the National Shooting Center.

The event consisted of two rounds: a qualifier and a final. In the qualifier, each shooter fired 40 shots with an air rifle at 10 metres distance from the standing position.

The top 8 shooters in the qualifying round moved on to the final round. There, they fired an additional 20 shots. These shots scored in increments of .1, with a maximum score of 10.9.

19 year-old shooter Virginia Thrasher won the event with the score of 208.0, breaking the Olympic record and became the first gold-medalist of 2016 Summer Olympics

The medals were presented by Thomas Bach, IOC President and Olegario Vázquez Raña, President of the International Shooting Sport Federation.

Records
Prior to this competition, the existing world and Olympic records were as follows.

The following records were established during the competition:

Qualification round

Final

References

External links
 Results

Shooting at the 2016 Summer Olympics
Olym
Women's events at the 2016 Summer Olympics